Like its Eastern Caribbean neighbours, the main priority of Dominica's foreign relations is economic development. The country maintains missions in Washington, New York, London, and Brussels and is represented jointly with other Organisation of Eastern Caribbean States (OECS) members in Canada. Dominica is also a member of the Caribbean Development Bank (CDB), Organisation internationale de la Francophonie, and the Commonwealth of Nations. It became a member of the United Nations and the International Monetary Fund (IMF) in 1978 and of the World Bank and Organization of American States (OAS) in 1979.

As a member of CARICOM, in July 1994 Dominica strongly backed efforts by the United States to implement United Nations Security Council Resolution 940, designed to facilitate the departure of Haiti's de facto authorities from power. The country agreed to contribute personnel to the multinational force, which restored the democratically elected government of Haiti in October 1994.

In May 1997, Prime Minister James joined 14 other Caribbean leaders, and President Clinton, during the first-ever U.S.-regional summit in Bridgetown, Barbados. The summit strengthened the basis for regional cooperation on justice and counternarcotics issues, finance and development, and trade. Dominica previously maintained official relations with the Republic of China (commonly known as "Taiwan") instead of the People's Republic of China, but on 23 March 2004, a joint communique was signed in Beijing, paving the way for diplomatic recognition of the People's Republic. Beijing responded to Dominica's severing relations with the Republic of China by giving them a $12 million aid package, which includes $6 million in budget support for the year 2004 and $1 million annually for six years.

In June 2020, Dominica was one of 53 countries backing the Hong Kong national security law at the United Nations.

Dominica is also a member of the International Criminal Court with a Bilateral Immunity Agreement of protection for the US-military (as covered under Article 98).

International disputes

Dominica claims Venezuelan controlled Isla Aves (Known in Dominica as Bird Rock) located roughly 90 km. west of Dominica.

Diplomatic relations

Bilateral relations

Dominica and the Commonwealth of Nations 

The Commonwealth of Dominica has been a member of the Commonwealth of Nations since 1978, when it became an independent from the United Kingdom as a republic in the Commonwealth of Nations.

Dominica's highest court of appeal is the Caribbean Court of Justice, in effect from 6 March 2015. Previously, the nation's ultimate court of appeal was the Judicial Committee of the Privy Council in London.

See also

West Indies Associated States
Organisation of Eastern Caribbean States
List of diplomatic missions in Dominica
List of diplomatic missions of Dominica
Dominica–France Maritime Delimitation Agreement

References

External links
 The United States Department of State - The Commonwealth of Dominica

 
Government of Dominica
Dominica and the Commonwealth of Nations